Bailón Becerra (born 15 June 1966) is a Bolivian former cyclist. He competed in three events at the 1988 Summer Olympics.

References

1966 births
Living people
Bolivian male cyclists
Cyclists at the 1988 Summer Olympics
Olympic cyclists of Bolivia
People from Obispo Santistevan Province